Nikki Jayne Hamblin (born 20 May 1988) is a New Zealand middle distance runner who specialises in the 800 and 1500 metres. Born in England, Hamblin ran for the Dorchester Athletics Club before moving to New Zealand in 2006. She gained New Zealand citizenship in 2009. In 2010, Hamblin became the New Zealand record holder in the 1500 metres and won the silver medal in both the 800 and 1500 metres at the 2010 Commonwealth Games in Delhi.

At the 2016 Summer Olympics in Rio de Janeiro, she received considerable international media attention following an incident during the 5000m heat in which both she and American Abbey D'Agostino fell. The two women helped each other finish the race and were allowed to compete in the final, however D'Agostino had suffered a torn anterior cruciate ligament and meniscus and was unable to participate further. Hamblin's injuries were less serious and she was able to compete in the final, however she finished last. Both athletes were praised for their sportsmanship and "olympic spirit", and were subsequently awarded the Rio 2016 Fair Play Award by the International Fair Play Committee.

Personal bests

International competitions

References

External links
 

New Zealand female middle-distance runners
Commonwealth Games medallists in athletics
Commonwealth Games silver medallists for New Zealand
Athletes (track and field) at the 2010 Commonwealth Games
Athletes (track and field) at the 2014 Commonwealth Games
Athletes (track and field) at the 2016 Summer Olympics
1988 births
Living people
World Athletics Championships athletes for New Zealand
Olympic athletes of New Zealand
English emigrants to New Zealand
People with acquired New Zealand citizenship
Expatriate sportspeople in England
Medallists at the 2010 Commonwealth Games